Alfred C. Werner (September 24, 1917 – January 10, 2013) was an American football, basketball, soccer, and track coach, physical education professor, and college athletics administrator.

Biography
Werner earned a doctorate in physical education from Springfield College and taught at the University at Albany, SUNY, the State University of New York at Plattsburgh, the United States Military Academy, and Allegheny College.

Coaching career
Werner was the head football coach at Allegheny College in Meadville, Pennsylvania for the 1941 and 1942 seasons. His coaching record at Allegheny was 2–10. Werner died in Sun City, Arizona in January 2013 at the age of 95.

References

1917 births
2013 deaths
American men's basketball players
Albany Great Danes athletic directors
Allegheny Gators football coaches
Allegheny Gators men's basketball coaches
Allegheny College faculty
United States Military Academy faculty
University at Albany, SUNY faculty
Springfield Pride football players
Springfield Pride men's basketball players
College men's track and field athletes in the United States
People from Ilion, New York